is a subway station on the Tokyo Metro Marunouchi Line in Nakano, Tokyo, Japan, operated by the Tokyo subway operator Tokyo Metro.

Lines
The station is numbered "Mb-05".

Station layout
The station has two side platforms serving two tracks on the second basement (B2F) level. There is a single entrance at the north end of the station, with the ticket vending machines and ticket barriers located at ground level.

Platforms

History
Nakano-shimbashi Station opened on 8 February 1961.

The station facilities were inherited by Tokyo Metro after the privatization of the Teito Rapid Transit Authority (TRTA) in 2004.

Passenger statistics
In fiscal 2011, the station was used by an average of 17,730 passengers daily.

Surrounding area
 Tokyo Polytechnic University Nakano campus
 Honcho Library
 Nakano No. 2 Junior High School
 Momozono Elementary School
 Mukodai Elementary School
 Nakano Hongo Elementary School
 Kanda River

In popular culture
The 1967 James Bond film You Only Live Twice used Nakano-Shimbashi station as the location for Tiger Tanaka's private transportation hub.

References

External links

 Nakano-shimbashi Station information (Tokyo Metro) 

Stations of Tokyo Metro
Tokyo Metro Marunouchi Line
Railway stations in Tokyo
Railway stations in Japan opened in 1961